Phyxium papuanum is a species of beetle in the family Cerambycidae. It was described by Stephan von Breuning in 1943. It is known from Papua New Guinea.

References

Lamiinae
Beetles described in 1943